The 1835 United Kingdom general election was called when Parliament was dissolved on 29 December 1834.  Polling took place between 6 January and 6 February 1835, and the results saw Robert Peel's Conservatives make large gains from their low of the 1832 election, but the Whigs maintained a large majority.

Under the terms of the Lichfield House Compact the Whigs had entered into an electoral pact with the Irish Repeal Association of Daniel O'Connell, which had contested the previous election as a separate party. The Radicals were also included in this alliance.

Dates of election
The eleventh United Kingdom Parliament was dissolved on 29 December 1834. The new Parliament was summoned to meet on 19 February 1835, for a maximum seven-year term from that date. The maximum term could be and normally was curtailed, by the monarch dissolving the Parliament, before its term expired.

At this period there was not one election day. After receiving a writ (a royal command) for the election to be held, the local returning officer fixed the election timetable for the particular constituency or constituencies he was concerned with. Polling in seats with contested elections could continue for many days.

The general election took place between January and February 1835. The first nomination was on 5 January, with the first contest on 6 January and the last contest on 6 February 1835. It was usual for polling in the University constituencies and in Orkney and Shetland to take place about a week after other seats. Disregarding contests in the Universities and Orkney and Shetland, the last poll was on 27 January 1835.

Peel ran a minority Conservative government until 8 April 1835, after being unable to form a majority. Melbourne subsequently became Prime Minister forming a Whig government.

Results

|}

Voting summary

Seats summary

Regional results

Great Britain

England

Scotland

Wales

Ireland

Universities

Notes

References

External links
 Spartacus: Political Parties and Election Results

 
1835 elections in the United Kingdom
General election
1835
January 1835 events
February 1835 events